The Zumeta River, or Río Zumeta in Spanish, is a river in southeastern Spain in the Province of Albacete, Spain. The Zumeta is a formed from a confluence of various streams near Santiago de la Espada in the Province of Jaén. It is a tributary of the Segura River.

Course 
The Zumeta flows by the Sierras de Cazorla, Segura y Las Villas Natural Park, serving first as a park border then as a border of the Province of Albacete before it flows into the Segura River.

Flora and Fauna 
The Zumeta, together with the Aguacebas River, the Madera River, and the Anchuricas Reservoir (el Embalse de Anchuricas), is one of the areas of the Sierras de Cazorla, Segura y Las Villas Natural Park designated as a high-mountain trout fishing area with rules for catch-and-release fishing of the brown trout. 

The Zumeta is protected as a natural river reserve from its point of origin to the Novia Reservoir.

See also
List of rivers of Spain

References

Rivers of Spain
Rivers of the Province of Albacete
Rivers of Castilla–La Mancha

Bibliography 

 Carreño Cuevas, A. y Mateo Saura, M.A.: Investigaciones de arte rupestre en la cuenca del río Zumeta (Albacete y Jaén),  II Congreso de Historia de Albacete: del 22 al 25 de noviembre de 2000, Vol. 1, 2002 (Arqueología y prehistoria / coord. por Rubí Sanz Gamo), ISBN 84-95394-40-5, págs. 103-109.